VA-304, nicknamed the Firebirds, was an Attack Squadron of the U.S. Navy Reserve, based at NAS Alameda, California. It was established on 1 July 1970, and disestablished almost 25 years later, on 31 December 1994.

Operational history
1 July 1970: VA-304, a reserve squadron, established as part of a reorganization intended to increase the combat readiness of the Naval Air Reserve Force. Elements of reserve unit, VA-20G3, were used to form the newly established VA-304.
May 1987: VA-304 operated from the Canadian Forces Base Edmonton, Alberta, while participating in exercise Rendezvous 87-Bold Warrior. The exercise was a mock full-scale battle between elements of the Canadian Armed Forces with VA-304 acting as an aggressor force.
August 1988: VA-304 was the first reserve squadron to receive and operate the A-6E Intruder.

Aircraft assignment
The squadron first received the following aircraft on the dates shown:
 A-4C Skyhawk – Jul 1970
 A-7A Corsair II – 06 Aug 1971
 A-7B Corsair II – Sep 1977
 A-7E Corsair II – Sep 1986
 KA-6D Intruder – 22 Jul 1988
 A-6E Intruder – 05 Aug 1988

See also
List of squadrons in the Dictionary of American Naval Aviation Squadrons
Attack aircraft
List of inactive United States Navy aircraft squadrons
History of the United States Navy

References

Attack squadrons of the United States Navy
Wikipedia articles incorporating text from the Dictionary of American Naval Aviation Squadrons